Song Seung-tae (born January 3, 1972) is a retired field hockey striker from South Korea, who was a member of the Men's National Team that won the silver medal at the 2000 Summer Olympics in Sydney. In the final the South Koreans were beaten by the Dutch title holders after penalty strokes.

Song played club hockey in Malaysia with Sapura HC after playing in Germany. His Olympic debut was at the 1996 Summer Olympics in Atlanta and he also competed at the 2004 Summer Olympics in Athens.

References 
 Profile on Athens 2004 Web Site

External links

1972 births
Living people
South Korean male field hockey players
Olympic field hockey players of South Korea
Field hockey players at the 1996 Summer Olympics
Field hockey players at the 2000 Summer Olympics
Field hockey players at the 2004 Summer Olympics
Olympic silver medalists for South Korea
1998 Men's Hockey World Cup players
2002 Men's Hockey World Cup players
Asian Games medalists in field hockey
Field hockey players at the 1998 Asian Games
Field hockey players at the 2002 Asian Games
Olympic medalists in field hockey
South Korean expatriates in Germany
Expatriate sportspeople in Germany
University of Cologne alumni
Medalists at the 2000 Summer Olympics
Asian Games gold medalists for South Korea
Asian Games silver medalists for South Korea
Medalists at the 1998 Asian Games
Medalists at the 2002 Asian Games